The Minister of Foreign Affairs of the Republic of Chad is a government minister in charge of the Ministry of Foreign Affairs of Chad, responsible for conducting foreign relations of the country.

The following is a list of foreign ministers of Chad since its founding in 1960:

Sources
Rulers.org – Foreign ministers A–D

Foreign
Foreign Ministers
Politicians